Kempt  is a community in the Canadian province of Nova Scotia, located in the Region of Queens Municipality.   Kempt is named after General Sir James Kempt, who served as Lieutenant Governor of Nova Scotia from 1820 to 1828.

References
Kempt on Destination Nova Scotia

Communities in the Region of Queens Municipality
General Service Areas in Nova Scotia